Shen Jianping (born 1961) is a former female Chinese international table tennis player.

Table tennis career
She won a gold medal at the 1983 World Table Tennis Championships in the women's doubles with Dai Lili.

See also
 List of table tennis players
 List of World Table Tennis Championships medalists

References

Chinese female table tennis players
Table tennis players from Shanghai
1961 births
Living people
World Table Tennis Championships medalists